The 2020 Pocono Organics 150 to Benefit Farm Aid was the 6th stock car race of the 2020 NASCAR Gander RV & Outdoors Truck Series season, and the 11th iteration of the event. The race was postponed from Saturday, June 27, 2020 to the next day, Sunday, June 28, due to rain. The race was held in Long Pond, Pennsylvania at Pocono Raceway, a  triangular-shaped permanent racetrack. The race took 60 laps to complete. After a late race caution, Brandon Jones of Kyle Busch Motorsports would compete with Sheldon Creed for the win, eventually besting him to win the race, his first ever NASCAR Gander RV & Outdoors Truck Series. To fill the podium, Austin Hill of Hattori Racing Enterprises and Sheldon Creed of GMS Racing would finish 2nd and 3rd, respectively.

Background

Entry list 

*Driver changed to Bayley Currey due to Natalie Decker being hospitalized for having gall bladder complications from surgery.

Starting lineup 
The starting lineup was based on a random draw. As a result, Johnny Sauter of ThorSport Racing won the pole.

Race results 
Stage 1 Laps: 15

Stage 2 Laps: 15

Stage 3 Laps: 30

References 

2020 NASCAR Gander RV & Outdoors Truck Series
NASCAR races at Pocono Raceway
June 2020 sports events in the United States
2020 in sports in Pennsylvania